M.M. Robinson High School is a high school located in Burlington, Ontario, Canada. It is administered by the Halton District School Board. There are approx. 1200 students attending MMR with programs addressing all Pathways.

Founded in 1963, the school is named after the founder of the British Empire Games, Melville Marks Robinson.

In fall 2018, staff and students from Lester B. Pearson High School were transferred to the school as LBP had closed.

Academics
Students opt for a variety of pathways, with approximately 80% traditionally going to university , 15% going to college, and the remaining 5% going to the workplace.
The school has a notable French immersion program and Ontario Youth Apprenticeship Program (OYAP).

Athletics
The mascot of the school teams is a ram, and school colours are maroon and gold. During the 2005–2006 school year the mascot uniform was taken by a graduating honours student as a year-end prank. It was later returned anonymously post commencement.

The school has a successful baseball program and two students, Mark McDonald and Paul McDonald were drafted in 2001 for the Toronto Blue Jays.

In 1990 Boys Baseball won the Blue Jay Cup Championship at Skydome.

The Boys Baseball team won the Halton Secondary School Athletic Association Championship in 2007, 2008 and 2010.

The Senior Men's basketball team won the Halton Championships in 1991.

The Senior Men's hockey team won the silver medal at OFSAA in 1987.

The Men's hockey team were Peel Halton Champions in 1970-71.

The Senior Men's football team made their OFSAA Golden Horseshoe Bowl finals debut in 2012. They lost to the Lakeshore Catholic Gators of Port Colborne by a score of 29–28, despite leading 21–8 at halftime.

The Robinson Rams have a long history of football alumni going on to play in university or professionally, this list extended in 2016 as AJ Allen signed his Letter of Intent to play with the University of Guelph Gryphons football program.  Allen was the 35th overall selection for the 2020 CFL Draft, by the Saskatchewan Roughriders.

MMRambotics
MM Robinson's FIRST Robotics team was founded June, 2006 by students Jason Patel and Matthew Gardner. The team participates in the Waterloo Regional and the Greater Toronto Regional events. Some of the teams notable accomplishments are:
 Rookie Inspiration Award - 2007
 Silver Medal at Halton Skills Competition - 2007
 Silver Medal at Halton Skills Competition - 2008
 Semi-Finalist at Waterloo regional - 2008
 Judges Award at Waterloo regional - 2009
 Finalist at Waterloo regional - 2009
 Quarter-Finalist at Toronto regional - 2009
 Quarter-Finalist at Waterloo - 2010
 Judges Award, Waterloo Regional - 2011
 First Place, Greater Toronto West Regional - 2012
 Creativity Award, Pine Tree Regional - 2013
 Team Spirit Award; Innovation in Control Award, North Bay Regional - 2014
 Excellence in Engineering Award, Palmetto Regional - 2014

MM Robinson Drumline
The MM Robinson Drumline was started in 2007 by Carolyn French, Zach Leslie, and a small group of students who met in the cafeteria and practiced on drum pads. The drumline has since grown to over 30 members and regularly performs over 30 times a season.  These include performances within the school, the school board, the community and Southern Ontario. They have performed at the Ontario Music Educators Association Conference, the Olympic Torch Relay in Hamilton, the Toronto Rock Home Opener at the ACC and on Breakfast Television. These landmark events give the students of M.M. Robinson High School the opportunity to promote marching percussion as an emerging activity throughout Ontario.

Notable events
Stephen Lewis, who gave a passionate speech about the crisis of the AIDS pandemic in Africa at MMR on March 5, 2007, was presented with a cheque for over $15,000. The money was raised by MMR students through activities in school and in the community at large.  By March 2007 students had raised $25,000 for charity, including $15,185.50 for the Stephen Lewis Foundation's fund to assist African women raising grandchildren orphaned by AIDS.

Notable alumni and alumna
 Warren Adelman, former CEO, GoDaddy group of companies
Tad Crawford - 2002 Graduate - A safety for the BC Lions
Nicole Dorsey, screenwriter and director
Karina Gould, Member of Parliament for Burlington (2015–Present) and current Minister of International Development
Oskar Johansson - 1996 Graduate - Gold Medal - 1999 Pan Am Games, Olympian Athens 2004 (15th) and Beijing 2008 (4th), Silver Medal 2008 World Championships - Sailing
Leslie Mahaffy, murder victim of Paul Bernardo and Karla Homolka
Dave Ridgway, a placekicker for the Saskatchewan Roughriders and Hall of Famer
 Mike "Beard Guy" Taylor, keyboardist Walk Off The Earth
 Matthew Gardner, Founder, Videostream and RouteThis
Reg Denis, graduated 1968, Member of “Crackers” rock group

See also
List of high schools in Ontario

References

External links
Official website
MMRambotics website

High schools in Burlington, Ontario
Educational institutions established in 1963
1963 establishments in Ontario